Universal 360: A Cinesphere Spectacular was a fireworks show attraction located at Universal Studios Florida. It replaced the Dynamite Nights Stunt Spectacular, and featured famous scenes from Universal Pictures' films projected onto four large inflated domes in a lagoon located in the center of the park. The show generally took place at the hour of the park's closing. It was directed by John Landis, whose other works include The Blues Brothers and An American Werewolf in London.  In 2009, the show was edited and some shorter scenes were removed and replaced by other clips.

The show operated during major events and holidays including Easter, The 4th of July, Labor Day, Christmas and New Year's Eve. The spheres in the lagoon are usually removed for refurbishment during off-peak seasons.

History
Dynamite Nights Stunt Spectacular opened with the park on June 7, 1990. The live stunt show was located on the Lagoon in the center of Universal Studios Florida. The show was themed around Miami Vice and featured a variety of pyrotechnics mixed with explosions and live actors on jet skis. Dynamite Nights Stunt Spectacular was discontinued on February 10, 2000. Many of the props and sets in the show still remained in place until July 1, 2006, when the show was replaced by Universal 360: A Cinesphere Spectacular.

Summary
Universal 360: A Cinesphere Spectacular was a live fireworks experience, which took place at night during peak seasons only. It featured famous scenes from Universal Pictures films projected onto four large inflated domes in the middle of a lagoon, while various fireworks, flame effects, lasers, lights and water effects are set off. There are at least three viewing areas around the lake in which it is displayed. Projectors were located in a small boathouse facade on the lake, on the sound Stage 44 building, and on the side of The Simpsons Ride building. During major summer holidays, such as the Fourth of July, at least two or three shows were displayed.

The show's score was a combination of other various Universal Pictures' films, including Back to the Future, Apollo 13, Jaws, Jurassic Park and E.T. the Extra-Terrestrial. The score was directed and composed by Brad Kelley.

In an homage to the previous Dynamite Nights Stunt Spectacular attraction which it replaced, scenes showcasing the attraction were seen projected onto the spheres. The Cinespheres have the same air control found in a small house.

In popular culture 
The year the show opened, that year's Bill & Ted's Excellent Halloween Adventure at Halloween Horror Nights contained a storyline in which Lex Luthor planned to use the Cinespheres (revealed to be the tops of nuclear warheads) and smash them balls deep into the park, destroying it. The resulting ruins would allow Lex to build Luthorversal, a Universal Studios knock-off featuring attractions based on what was, at the time, current events.

See also
 2011 in amusement parks

References 

Former Universal Studios Florida attractions
Universal Studios Florida
Universal Parks & Resorts attractions by name
2006 establishments in Florida
2011 disestablishments in Florida